Pentimento: A Book of Portraits is a 1973 book by American writer Lillian Hellman. It is best known for the controversy over the authenticity of a section about an anti-Nazi activist called "Julia", which was later made into the film Julia. A psychiatrist named Muriel Gardiner later suggested that her life story was fictionalized as Julia. Gardiner was a wealthy American who went to medical school in Vienna before World War II and became involved in anti-Fascist resistance there before her return to the US in 1939.

Controversy
The Oscar-winning film Julia was based on one chapter of Pentimento. Following the film's release in 1977, New York psychiatrist Muriel Gardiner claimed she was the basis for the title character. The story presents "Julia" as a close friend of Hellman's living in pre-Nazi Austria. Hellman helps her friend to smuggle money for anti-Nazi activity from Russia. In fact Hellman had never met Gardiner. Hellman denied that the character was based on Gardiner, but never identified a real-life alternative. Hellman and Gardiner had the same lawyer (Wolf Schwabacher) who had been privy to Gardiner's memoirs. The events depicted in the film conformed to those described in Gardiner's 1983 memoir Code Name Mary.

An investigation by Samuel McCraken into the particulars of Hellman's Julia story that was published in Commentary in June 1984 concluded that the funeral home in London where Hellman said Julia's body was sent to did not exist, there was no record that Hellman had sailed to England to claim Julia's body on the ship she said she had made the transatlantic crossing on, and there was no evidence that Julia had lived or died. Furthermore, McCracken found it highly unlikely, as did Gardiner, who had worked with the anti-fascist underground, that so many people would have been used to help Hellman get money to Julia, or that money would be couriered in the way that Hellman said it did as Hellman admitted that Julia received money from the J. P. Morgan Bank.

Ephraim London, Hellman's attorney in her libel suit against Mary McCarthy (who had publicly questioned Hellman's veracity, including her "Julia" story), admitted that while he believed that there had been a real Julia, Hellman has most likely dramatized her story and added incidents and plot elements that were not strictly true.

References

American biographies
American novels adapted into films
1973 books